Oldtown Creek is a stream located entirely within Tuscarawas County, Ohio.

Oldtown Creek most likely was so named for the fact it flows near the Schoenbrunn Village, one of the oldest settlements in Ohio.

See also
List of rivers of Ohio

References

Rivers of Tuscarawas County, Ohio
Rivers of Ohio